Hilton Delaney (1908-1981) was an Australian professional rugby league footballer who played in the New South Wales Rugby League (NSWRL) competition.

Playing career
A Winger from Narrabri, New South Wales, Delaney played for St George in 1928 (14 matches), University in 1929-1930 (19 matches),  Eastern Suburbs in 1931–33 (24 matches), and South Sydney in 1937 (1 match).

Delaney was a try scorer for Eastern Suburbs in the 1931 and 1932 semi-finals. While playing for the Tri_colours in 1933 Delaney was chosen to represent NSW.

Death
Delaney died on 7 September 1981.

References

"The Encyclopedia Of Rugby League", Alan Whiticker & Glen Hudson

Australian rugby league players
Sydney Roosters players
1908 births
1981 deaths
Sydney University rugby league team players
New South Wales rugby league team players
St. George Dragons players
South Sydney Rabbitohs players
Rugby league players from New South Wales
Rugby league centres
Rugby league wingers